Tsuboimo-ike Dam is an earthfill dam located in Ehime Prefecture in Japan. The dam is used for irrigation.  The dam impounds about 1  ha of land when full and can store 6 thousand cubic meters of water. The construction of the dam was completed in 1942.

References

Dams in Ehime Prefecture
1942 establishments in Japan